Emmanuel Iwe (born September 12, 2000) is a Nigerian footballer player who plays as a forward for MLS Next Pro club Minnesota United 2.

Career

Youth
Iwe was born in Lagos, Nigeria, but was raised in St. Louis Park, Minnesota in the United States. He graduated from St. Louis Park High School in 2019. Iwe also played with local club side Joy of the People from 2009.

In 2018, Iwe traveled to trial with German side SV Werder Bremen. In early 2020, Iwe spent time with Costa Rican side Deportivo Saprissa, before having to return to the United States due to the COVID-19 pandemic.

College 
In 2021, Iwe played college soccer at St. Cloud State University. In his freshman season, he made 18 appearances, scoring six goals and tallying four assists, and was named All-GLIAC Second Team. 

During the 2021 season, Iwe also competed with National Premier Soccer League, side Joy St. Louis Park during their inaugural season in the NPSL. Here he scored nine goals in 12 regular season games.

Professional
On March 3, 2022, Iwe signed a professional contract with MLS Next Pro side Minnesota United 2. In his debut season, Iwe scored two goals and had two assists to his name over 16 regular season games. 

Following the 2022 seaosn, Iwe entered the 2023 MLS SuperDraft as an eligible selection. Iwe was selected 48th overall by Minnesota United, helping the team acquire his Major League Soccer rights should he sign to the club's first team roster.

References

2000 births
Living people
Sportspeople from Lagos
Nigerian footballers
Nigerian emigrants to the United States
Association football forwards
Minnesota United FC draft picks
MLS Next Pro players
National Premier Soccer League players
St. Cloud State Huskies athletes